Shripad Krishna Belvalkar (1881 in Narsobawadi – 8 January 1967 in Poona) was an Indian scholar of Sanskrit, educator, historian, and writer, best known for his translations and editions of the Uttararamacarita, the Kavyadarsha, and the Bhagavad Gita, and his research on Sanskrit grammar, Indian philosophy and Indology. He served as honorary secretary of the Bhandarkar Oriental Research Institute, frequently collaborated with Ramachandra Dattatrya Ranade, and his works have since become a part of the Harvard Oriental Series.

References 

1881 births
1967 deaths
Indian scholars
Indian educators
Indian historians
Indian writers
Indologists